Sahassa Malla (also known as "the lion-hearted king") was King of Polonnaruwa in the thirteenth century. He ruled the Kingdom of Polonnaruwa from 1200 to 1202. He succeeded Lilavati, who was removed from the throne by her co-ministers. He was deposed by General Ayasmantha and succeeded by Kalyanavati. He was the younger brother of Nissanka Malla.

See also
 History of Sri Lanka
 List of Sri Lankan monarchs

References

External links
 Kings & Rulers of Sri Lanka
 Codrington's Short History of Ceylon

Monarchs of Polonnaruwa
S
S
S